Thingin is a live album by saxophonist Lee Konitz, pianist Don Friedman and guitarist Attila Zoller which was recorded in Switzerland in 1995 and released on the Swiss HatART label.

Reception 

The AllMusic review by Steve Loewy states: "If the session does not totally stand out from the wealth of others the saxophonist has led it is only because of the plethora of high quality disks Konitz has produced during his career. In every way, this one is a worthy contribution to his discography, with the characteristic beautiful and mellow tone, laid-back style, and advanced harmonics". In JazzTimes, Harvey Pekar wrote "Konitz, Zoller and Friedman play as one here. Indeed, they do seem to share similar musical backgrounds and values ... It’s a pleasure to hear them work. Not only have they all been around for a while, they’ve learned a lot. Their playing is almost cliche-free, and their contrapuntal work hangs together quite well".

Track listing 
 "Thingin'" (Lee Konitz) – 11:54
 "Joy for Joy" (Attila Zoller) – 12:07
 "Opus d'Amour" (Don Friedman) – 8:52
 "Cloisterbells" (Zoller) – 3:38
 "Images" (Friedman) – 4:22
 "Alone Together" (Arthur Schwartz, Howard Dietz) – 10:24	
 "Suite for 3" (Friedman) – 13:49

Personnel 
Lee Konitz – alto saxophone (tracks 1-3, 6 & 7)
Don Friedman – piano (tracks 1-3 & 5-7)
Attila Zoller – guitar (tracks 1-4, 6 & 7)

References 

1996 live albums
Hathut Records live albums
Lee Konitz live albums
Don Friedman albums
Attila Zoller albums